Lac de Saint-Andéol is a lake in Lozère, France, located on the Aubrac plateau. It has an elevation of 1225 m and its surface area is 0.11 km². It is the most important lake of the plateau and known for its legends, and is of glacial origin like the other lakes in this area (Salhiens, Souveyrols, and Born).

Saint Andeol